The State Maritime and Port  Agency under the Ministry of Digital Development and Transport is a public legal entity within the Cabinet of Azerbaijan in charge of regulating activities in the maritime sector of Azerbaijan Republic.

History
The State Maritime Administration was established by the Presidential Decree No. 697 on April 21, 2006. It is a member of International Maritime Organization and regularly attends the conferences dedicated to maritime security. The agency also establishes cooperation with other countries with maritime boundaries. According to the decree of the President of the Republic of Azerbaijan dated January 12, 2018 “On some measures to improve management in the field of transport, communications and high technologies in the Republic of Azerbaijan”, the Administration became part of the Ministry of Transport, Communications and High Technologies of the Republic of Azerbaijan. It is operating as the State Maritime Agency under the Ministry. The Agency is responsible for maritime transportation within the borders of the Republic of Azerbaijan.

Structure
The agency is headed by its chief. Main functions of the administration include safety of maritime navigation; servicing of waterways and channels with the Republic of Azerbaijan; management of movement of ships; investigations of accidents in the sea; drafting of legislations related to maritime sector and immediate control over their implementation; protection of marine environment; control over navigational aids and systems; ensuring search and rescue at sea; registration of vessels; maritime training of personnel; supervising security assurance at sea; implementation of hydrographic services; surveying and certification of sea port facilities. The Head of the State Maritime Administration and deputies are appointed to their positions by the Decree of the President of the Republic of Azerbaijan. The staff of Administration consists of 48 people who are mainly qualified specialists with experiences in this field. Additionally, the agency comprises crew department, law, human resources and international relations department, ship registration and control on ship standards department, transport and technical maintenance office.

The agency consists of Personnel, International Relation and Law Department, Crew Service Department, Diploma and Certification, Passport offices, Maritime Inspection, Technical Service and General departments.

International relations 
During 2011, the Administration built relationships with related state organizations of Greece, Russia, Kazakhstan and Poland as the result of agreements between the mentioned states and the Republic of Azerbaijan.

With a Memorandum of Cooperation with the Ministry of Oceans and Fisheries of Korea which was approved by a presidential decree, SMA started to collaborate with this organization for the purpose of mutual goals.

The similar agreement was signed with Turkey in order to improve maritime relations and ensure overcome safety problems in this field.

On August 8, 2017, according to an agreement between the Government of the Republic of Azerbaijan and the Government of the Republic of Turkmenistan for the purpose of developing  maritime trade and strengthening economic ties with the two countries.

Furthermore, The Republic of Azerbaijan is a member of the International Maritime Organization since May 15, 1995.

Activities 
The Administration is guided by the Constitution of the Republic of Azerbaijan, laws of the Republic of Azerbaijan, decrees and orders of the President of the Republic of Azerbaijan, and Statute on the State Maritime Administration.

See also
Cabinet of Azerbaijan
Caspian Sea
Water bodies of Azerbaijan

References

State Maritime and Port Agency
Government agencies established in 2006
2006 establishments in Azerbaijan